Tarcisio Longoni (28 May 1913 – 14 May 1990) was an Italian minister.

Life
Longoni was born in Brugherio in 1913. He served as an Italian deputy from 12 June 1958 to 15 May 1963. During this time he served as Secretary of State for Foreign Trade for Amintore Fanfani's third government from 28 July 1960 to 20 February 1962. He died in 1990.

References

1913 births
1990 deaths
People from Brugherio